Phoebe Paterson Pine  (born 3 December 1997) is a British paralympian and archer. She won gold in the Women's individual compound open at the 2020 Summer Paralympics in Tokyo. She defeated Jessica Stretton, and Tatiana Andrievskaia, to advance to the final.

Born in Siddington, Gloucestershire, Paterson Pine competed at the 2017 World Para Archery Championships, where she won a bronze medal.

Paterson Pine was appointed Member of the Order of the British Empire (MBE) in the 2022 New Year Honours for services to archery.

She won the bronze medal in her event at the 2022 World Para Archery Championships held in Dubai, United Arab Emirates.

References

External links
 
 
 

1997 births
Living people
British female archers
Paralympic archers of Great Britain
Paralympic gold medalists for Great Britain
Paralympic medalists in archery
Archers at the 2020 Summer Paralympics
Medalists at the 2020 Summer Paralympics
Members of the Order of the British Empire